Miia may refer to:

People
 Miia Hakala (b. 1987), Finnish artistic gymnast
 Miia Niemi (b. 1983), Finnish former footballer
 Miia Nuutila (b. 1972), Finnish television actress
 Miia Rannikmäe (b. 1951), Estonian chemist
 MIIA (b.1997), Norwegian singer

Fictional characters
 Miia, a character in the Japanese manga series Monster Musume